Mojama (Portuguese: muxama) is a Mediterranean delicacy consisting of filleted salt-cured tuna, typically found in the Murcia and Andalusia regions of Spain, particularly in Huelva and Cádiz. Bluefin or yellowfin tuna are the most common varieties used.

Etymology
The word mojama comes from the Arabic musama (dry) or  mušamma (made of wax) but its origins are Phoenician, specifically from Gdr (Gadir, Cádiz today), the first Phoenician settlement in the Western Mediterranean Sea. The Phoenicians had learned to dry tuna in sea salt to prepare it for trade.

Preparation
Mojama is made using the loins of the tuna by curing them in salt for two days or between 18 and 36 hours. The salt is then removed and the loins are washed. Some producers compress the meat to better release moisture. The loins are then laid out to dry in the sun and the breeze (according to the traditional method) for fifteen to twenty days. The final product is a dark brown loaf.

Serving
It is usually served in extremely thin slices with olive oil and chopped tomatoes or almonds (especially in Valencia). It can be served on bread or with pasta. In Madrid mojama is a very popular midafternoon tapa and is served with beer and olives. Mojama can also be paired with dry white or dry red wines.

Nutrition 
Mojama is high in protein and omega 3 fatty acids. It also contains B complex vitamins, magnesium, and vitamin D.

See also
Gravlax, Scandinavian cured raw salmon
Gwamegi, Korean half-dried Pacific herring or Pacific saury
Katsuobushi, Japanese dried and smoked bonito
Lox, Jewish cured salmon fillet
Lutefisk, Scandinavian salted/dried whitefish
Rakfisk, Norwegian salted and fermented fish
 List of dried foods
 List of Spanish dishes

References

External links

Andalusian cuisine
Italian cuisine
Spanish cuisine
Dried fish